Unai Núñez Gestoso (born 30 January 1997) is a Spanish professional footballer who plays as a centre back for RC Celta de Vigo, on loan from Athletic Bilbao, and the Spain national team.

Club career
Born in Sestao, Biscay, Basque Country and raised in neighbouring Portugalete, Núñez joined Athletic Bilbao's Lezama academy in 2007, aged ten. He made his debut as a senior with the farm team in the 2015–16 season, in Tercera División.

On 7 June 2016, Núñez was promoted to the reserves, freshly relegated to Segunda División B. He immediately became a starter for the side, appearing in 33 matches and scoring three goals during the campaign.

On 2 June 2017, Núñez was called up to the main squad for the pre-season by new first team manager José Ángel Ziganda. He made his first team – and La Liga – debut on 20 August, starting in a 0–0 home draw against Getafe CF.

On 30 October 2017, after already becoming a regular starter, Núñez renewed his contract until 2023, with a €30 million buyout clause. The following 31 March he scored his first goal in the main category, netting the opener in a 1–1 home draw against Celta de Vigo.

After 36 appearances in 2017–18, Núñez played much less (14 matches) during the 2018–19 season, initially finding himself behind rookie Peru Nolaskoain as well as Iñigo Martínez and Yeray Álvarez in the queue for selection in the position.

In November 2020 he signed an extended contract running to 2025, with no buyout clause. On 16 July 2022, he was loaned to fellow top tier side RC Celta de Vigo for the season.

International career
On 25 August 2017, Núñez received his first call-up to the Spain under-21 squad. He was called up to the full side by manager Robert Moreno on 30 August 2019, for two UEFA Euro 2020 qualifying matches against Romania and the Faroe Islands. He made his debut in the second fixture in Gijon on 8 September, coming on as a late substitute for Sergio Ramos with Spain 2–0 ahead; the final result was 4–0.

He has also played for the unofficial Basque Country team, making his debut against Costa Rica in November 2020 and scoring the winning goal with a header in the closing minutes.

Personal life
Núñez's father Abel was also a footballer and a defender who mainly represented Barakaldo CF during his career. His older brother Asier plays in the same position for local Club Portugalete.

Career statistics

Club

Honours
Athletic Bilbao
Supercopa de España: 2020–21
Copa del Rey: runner-up 2019–20, 2020–21

Spain U21
UEFA European Under-21 Championship: 2019

References

External links

1997 births
Living people
People from Portugalete
Sportspeople from Biscay
Spanish footballers
Footballers from the Basque Country (autonomous community)
Association football defenders
Spain international footballers
Spain under-21 international footballers
Basque Country international footballers
La Liga players
Segunda División B players
Tercera División players
CD Basconia footballers
Bilbao Athletic footballers
Athletic Bilbao footballers
RC Celta de Vigo players
Spanish people of Galician descent